Maksim Viktorovich Bondarenko (born 16 June  1981) is a former Russian professional footballer.

Club career
He made his professional debut in the Russian Second Division in 1998 for FC Rotor Volgograd.

Honours
 Top goal scorer (joint): 2010–11 Russian Cup

References

1981 births
Sportspeople from Volgograd
Living people
Russian footballers
Association football midfielders
Russian Premier League players
FC Rotor Volgograd players
FC Fakel Voronezh players
FC Oryol players
FC Sodovik Sterlitamak players
FC Baltika Kaliningrad players
FC Olimpia Volgograd players
FC Sakhalin Yuzhno-Sakhalinsk players